Bhookailas means Mount Kailash on the Bhoomi (Earth). It may also refer to:

 Bhookailas (1940 film), a Telugu film of AVM Productions starring Subbaiah Naidu
 Bhookailasa (1958 film), a Kannada film starring Rajkumar
 Bhookailas (1958 film), a Telugu film of AVM Productions starring N. T. Rama Rao
 Bhookailas (2007 film), a Telugu comedy film based on the real estate business in Hyderabad